Rona was a sailing yacht designed by George Lennox Watson. She was constructed in 1892 in Auckland, New Zealand, by master craftsman and designer Robert Logan Snr. for Wellington merchant and book collector Alexander Turnbull, and is the oldest continuously registered ship in New Zealand.

The boat is one of the finest surviving examples of a six-beam cutter (her beam fits into her length six times; i.e., she has very slim lines), she is a gaff-rigged racing cutter, and she is one of the oldest yachts still sailing in New Zealand.

Rona is an example of 19th-century racing yacht design and construction. The boat was originally painted black, the colour used on New Zealand's America's Cup yachts.

Rona was restored to original condition by her last private owner, John Palmer, which took over nine years. That Rona was able to be maintained as a fully operational sailing vessel for over 110 years is due to her construction in kauri pine (Agathis australis), a fine-grained timber of excellent quality for boat-building.

The Rona Preservation Trust was set up to purchase Rona. This was accomplished in November 2006, with the assistance of grants from the Lotteries Foundation others, and the boat was made accessible to the community through sailing events, maintenance and training days and public open days. Rona is now moored on the Wellington waterfront.

References

External links 
 
 
 

Ships of New Zealand
Individual sailing vessels
1892 ships